George Jackson (October 26, 1921 – March 16, 1986) was a British animator, who has worked on children's films and television programmes and is best known for his work on the 1989 animated film The BFG, and work with Martin Rosen on Watership Down and The Plague Dogs.

Filmography

Television series

External links

1921 births
1986 deaths
British animators